Simon Brandstetter (born 2 May 1990) is a German professional footballer who plays as a forward for Mainz 05 II.

Career
Brandstetter began his career with SC Freiburg, who he joined from Stuttgarter Kickers' youth team in 2009, and was promoted to the first team two years later. He made no first-team appearances during the 2011–12 season, and was loaned to Karlsruher SC in July 2012, making his debut five months later as a substitute for Koen van der Biezen in a 5–2 win over 1. FC Heidenheim. He made six appearances during the 2012–13 season, as Karlsruhe won the 3. Liga title, before joining Rot-Weiß Erfurt at the end of the season.

On 2 June 2015, he signed a two-year contract with MSV Duisburg for the 2015–16 season.

He moved to Wehen Wiesbaden on 1 January 2018, signing a contract until 2019. On 25 May 2019, Mainz 05 announced that Brandstetter would join their reserve team, Mainz 05 II, from the 2019–20 season.

International career
Brandstetter represented the Germany U20 team twice.

Career statistics

References

External links

1990 births
Living people
People from Esslingen am Neckar
Sportspeople from Stuttgart (region)
Footballers from Baden-Württemberg
Association football forwards
German footballers
Germany youth international footballers
VfL Kirchheim/Teck players
SC Freiburg players
Karlsruher SC players
FC Rot-Weiß Erfurt players
MSV Duisburg players
SV Wehen Wiesbaden players
1. FSV Mainz 05 II players
2. Bundesliga players
3. Liga players
Regionalliga players